is a Japanese footballer currently playing as a midfielder for YSCC Yokohama.

Career statistics

Club
.

Notes

References

External links

1996 births
Living people
Sportspeople from Ibaraki Prefecture
Association football people from Ibaraki Prefecture
Niigata University of Health and Welfare alumni
Japanese footballers
Association football midfielders
J3 League players
YSCC Yokohama players